The Vermillion Literary Project Magazine is an American literary magazine distributed by the University of South Dakota. The student-produced journal has been in publication since 1982 and is the culmination of the Vermillion Literary Project.

The annual journal publishes art, essays and short stories that center on a regional theme, but make exceptions for distinguished work from world-wide submissions. 
The journal receives thousands of submissions annually and has an acceptance rate of 1%, with a large number of acceptances coming from work produced about experiences in South Dakota.

The literary magazine uses a blind review process and is affiliated with the National Writing Project.

The Vermillion Literary Project Magazine publishes works centered on a specific theme that changes each year, and the journal is edited entirely by USD students, while faculty advises the process.

References

External links 
 Vermillion Literary Project Homepage

1982 establishments in South Dakota
Annual magazines published in the United States
Literary magazines published in the United States
Magazines established in 1982
Magazines published in South Dakota
Student magazines published in the United States
University of South Dakota